The Minister of Education and Ecclesiastical Affairs was a member of the government of Sweden. The minister of education and ecclesiastical affairs was the head of the Ministry of Education and Ecclesiastical Affairs from 1840 to 1967 which handled matters concerning the church, education, science, culture, medical and general health care as well as poorhouses. The minister of education and ecclesiastical affairs became the minister for education on 1 January 1968.

History

The Ministry of Education and Ecclesiastical Affairs was established in 1840 and Albrecht Elof Ihre became the first minister of education and ecclesiastical affairs. The head of the ministry bore the official title "cabinet minister and the head of the royal ministry of education and ecclesiastical affairs", but in everyday speech was usually called the minister of education and ecclesiastical affairs. In the early 1900s, other officials at the ministry were: one director general for administrative affairs (expeditionschef), three deputy directors (kansliråd) and director (byråchef), six administrative officers (kanslisekreterare), a registrar and a number of amanuenses (extra ordinary officials).

The Ministry of Education and Ecclesiastical Affairs became the Ministry of Education and Cultural Affairs on 1 January 1968 and thus the position of minister of education and ecclesiastical affairs became the minister for education. Olof Palme became the last minister of education and ecclesiastical affairs on 31 December 1967 and the first minister of education on 1 January 1968.

List of officeholders

References

Notes

Print

Lists of political office-holders in Sweden
1840 establishments in Sweden
1967 disestablishments in Sweden